Luc Plamondon, OC, CQ (b. March 2, 1942 in Saint-Raymond, Quebec), is a French-Canadian lyricist and music executive. He is best known for his work on the musicals Starmania and Notre-Dame de Paris.

He is the brother of Louis Plamondon, a long-serving member of the House of Commons of Canada.

Plamondon has accepted honours from Canadian institutions and is also known as a francophone nationalist and Quebec sovereigntist. He is opposed to Internet music piracy.

See also

 Culture of Quebec
 Music of Québec

References

External links
 Luc Plamondon on the website "Canada's Walk of Fame"

1942 births
Living people
French Quebecers
Songwriters from Quebec
People from Saint-Raymond, Quebec
Knights of the National Order of Quebec
Officers of the Order of Canada
Canadian musical theatre lyricists
Canadian Music Hall of Fame inductees
Best Original Song Genie and Canadian Screen Award winners
Musicians from Quebec
Governor General's Performing Arts Award winners